Laff-a-Day is a daily gag cartoon panel distributed to newspapers by King Features Syndicate from 1936 to 1998. The cartoonists included Frank Beaven, Henry Boltinoff, Dave Breger, Bo Brown, Orlando Busino, George Gately, Martin Giuffre, Al Kaufman, Reamer Keller, Harry Mace, Jack Markow, Don Orehek, Charles Skiles, Eli Stein, Jack Tippit and Bill Yates.

The editor of the series was cartoonist Bob Schroeter.

Reprints
When King Features revived the series in 2006, it ran this promotional copy:

King Features made Laff-a-Day a part of its King Features Weekly Planet service.

See also
1000 Jokes
This Funny World
laughitloud

References

External links
The Fabulous Fifties
Don Orehek Cartoons
Laff-a-Day

American comic strips
Gag-a-day comics
1936 comics debuts
Humor comics